Cheshmeh Kalan (also Romanized as Cheshmeh Kalān; also known as Kanī Kalān) is a village in Itivand-e Jonubi Rural District, Kakavand District, Delfan County, Lorestan Province, Iran. At the 2006 census, its population was 20, in 5 families.

References 

Towns and villages in Delfan County